Piker may refer to type of persons like a Miser, Pikey or Vagrant.

It may also refer to:

People
Hasan Piker (born 1991), American Twitch streamer and political commentator
Yosmani Piker (born 1987), Cuban male judoka

Fictional characters
Miranda Piker, a character cut from Roald Dahl's book Charlie and the Chocolate Factory before publication

Places
Piker lake, a lake in McLeod County, Minnesota, U.S.

See also
Pika
Pike (disambiguation)
Piker, vin og sang, a Norwegian sitcom